is a Japanese bobsledder. He competed at the 1972 Winter Olympics and the 1976 Winter Olympics.

References

1937 births
Living people
Japanese male bobsledders
Olympic bobsledders of Japan
Bobsledders at the 1972 Winter Olympics
Bobsledders at the 1976 Winter Olympics
Sportspeople from Hokkaido